Charlie Lee Byrd (September 16, 1925 – December 2, 1999) was an American jazz guitarist. Byrd was best known for his association with Brazilian music, especially bossa nova. In 1962, he collaborated with Stan Getz on the album Jazz Samba, a recording which brought bossa nova into the mainstream of North American music.

Byrd played fingerstyle on a classical guitar.

Early life
Charlie Byrd was born in 1925 in Suffolk, Virginia, and grew up in the borough of Chuckatuck. His father, a mandolinist and guitarist, taught him how to play the acoustic steel guitar at age 10. Byrd had three brothers, Oscar, Jack, and Gene "Joe" Byrd, who was a bass player. In 1942, Byrd entered the Virginia Polytechnic Institute and played in the school orchestra. In 1943, he was drafted into the United States Army, saw combat in World War II, and was stationed in Paris in 1945. There he played in an Army Special Services band and toured occupied Europe in the all-soldier production G.I. Carmen.

After the war, Byrd returned to the United States and studied composition and jazz theory at the Harnett National Music School in Manhattan, New York City. During this time, he began playing a classical guitar. After moving to Washington, D.C., in 1950, he studied classical guitar with Sophocles Papas for several years. In 1954, he became a pupil of the Spanish classical guitarist Andrés Segovia and spent time studying with him in Italy.

Byrd's earliest and greatest influence was the gypsy guitarist Django Reinhardt, whom he saw perform in Paris.

Career
In 1957, Byrd met double bassist Keter Betts in a Washington, D.C., club called the Vineyard. The two men began performing gigs together, and by October were frequently performing at a club called the Showboat. In 1959, they joined Woody Herman's band and toured Europe for three weeks as part of a State Department-sponsored goodwill tour. The other members of the band were Vince Guaraldi, Bill Harris, Nat Adderley and drummer Jimmy Campbell. Byrd led his own groups that sometimes featured his brother Joe. Byrd was also active as a teacher in the late 1950s; he trained guitar students at his home in Washington, D.C., each being required to audition before he agreed to be their teacher.

Byrd was introduced to Brazilian music by Felix Grant, a friend and radio host who had contacts in Brazil in the late 1950s, and who was well-known there by 1960 due to the efforts of Brazilian radio broadcaster Paulo Santos. Following a spring 1961 diplomatic tour of South America (including Brazil) for the State Department, Byrd returned home and met with Stan Getz at the Showboat Lounge. Byrd invited Getz back to his home to listen to some bossa nova recordings by João Gilberto and Antonio Carlos Jobim which he had brought back. Getz liked what he heard and the two decided that they wanted to make an album of the songs. The task of creating an authentic sound, however, proved much more challenging than either had anticipated.

Getz convinced Creed Taylor at Verve Records to produce the album. Taylor and Byrd assembled a group of musicians they knew. These early sessions did not turn out to either man's liking, so Byrd gathered a group of musicians that had been to Brazil with him previously and practiced with them in Washington, D.C. until he felt they were ready to record. The group included his brother Gene ("Joe") Byrd, as well as Keter Betts, Bill Reichenbach and Buddy Deppenschmidt. Reichenbach and Deppenschmidt were drummers, and the combination made it easier to achieve samba rhythm. Finally the group was deemed ready and Getz and Taylor arrived in Washington, D.C. on February 13, 1962. They recorded in a building adjacent to All Souls Unitarian Church because of the building's excellent acoustics.

Jazz Samba was released in April 1962, and by September it had entered the Billboard pop album chart. By March of the following year the album had moved to number one. The term "bossa nova" wasn't used until later. The album remained on the charts for seventy weeks, and Getz soon beat John Coltrane in a DownBeat poll. One of the album's most popular tunes was a Jobim hit, titled "Desafinado".

Following the success of Jazz Samba, Byrd signed with Riverside Records, which reissued six of his albums recorded for the small Offbeat label, a subsidiary of Washington Records.

On March 13, 14, 15, 16, 1963, Byrd travelled two hours south of Washington, DC to the University of Virginia in Charlottesville to provide music for an original musical, Lament For Guitar and Two Lovers.  The play was by Lee Devin of the UVa drama department, with music for 10-piece ensemble by Sidney Hodkinson of the UVa music department. Two nights later on March 18, the Byrd trio played a concert featuring “Lament for Guitar and Two Lovers” at Cabell Hall, the university’s acoustic auditorium. The solo dancer for the concert was Jocelyn Anker Moss. 

In 1963, Byrd toured Europe with Les McCann and Zoot Sims. Between 1964 and 1965, he appeared at the Newport Jazz Festival with Episcopal priest Malcolm Boyd, accompanying prayers from his book Are You Running With Me Jesus? with guitar. In 1967, Byrd brought a lawsuit against Stan Getz and MGM, contending that he was unfairly paid for his contributions to the 1962 album Jazz Samba. The jury agreed with Byrd and awarded him half the royalties from the album.

In 1973, Byrd moved to Annapolis, Maryland, and in September of that year he recorded an album with Cal Tjader titled Tambú, the only recording the two would make together. That same year, Byrd joined guitarists Herb Ellis and Barney Kessel and formed the Great Guitars group, which also included drummer Johnny Rae. Byrd collaborated with Venezuelan pianist and composer Aldemaro Romero on the album Onda Nueva/The New Wave.

From 1980 through 1996, he released several of his arrangements to the jazz and classical guitar community through Guitarist's Forum (gfmusic.com), including Charlie Byrd's Christmas Guitar Solos, Mozart: Seven Waltzes For Classical Guitar, and The Charlie Byrd Library featuring the music of George Gershwin and Irving Berlin. He also collaborated with the Annapolis Brass Quintet in the late 1980s, appearing with them in over 50 concerts across the United States and releasing two albums.

Byrd played for several years at a jazz club in Silver Spring, Maryland, called The Showboat II which was owned and managed by his manager, Peter Lambros. He was also home-based at the King of France Tavern nightclub at the Maryland Inn in Annapolis from 1973 until his death in 1999. In 1992, the book Jazz Cooks—by Bob Young and Al Stankus—was published by Stewart, Tabori & Chang, a compilation of recipes that include a few recipes from Byrd. He also authored the 1973 publication Charlie Byrd's Melodic Method for Guitar.

Personal life
Byrd was married to Rebecca Byrd, and had a son, Jeffrey, and two daughters from previous marriages, Carol Rose of Charlotte, NC, and Charlotte Byrd of Crownsville, MD. He loved sailboating, and owned a twenty-six-foot boat called "I'm Hip" that he sailed to various parts of the world.

Death
Charlie Byrd died of lung cancer on December 2, 1999 at his home in Annapolis, Maryland at the age of 74.

Awards
1999 – Knighted by the government of Brazil as a Knight of the Rio Branco
1997 – deemed a "Maryland Art Treasure" by the Community Arts Alliance of Maryland

Discography

As leader

As sideman
With Buck Clayton and Tommy Gwaltney's Kansas City 9
Goin' to Kansas City (Riverside, 1960)
With Helen Merrill
The Artistry of Helen Merrill (Mainstream, 1965)
With Joe Glazer
Garbage and Other Songs of Our Times (Collector, 1971)With Malcolm Boyd'Are You Running with Me, Jesus? (Columbia, 1965)Happening: Prayers for Now'' (Columbia, 1965)

References 

1925 births
1999 deaths
20th-century American guitarists
20th-century American male musicians
American acoustic guitarists
American jazz guitarists
American male guitarists
American male jazz musicians
Bossa nova guitarists
Brazilian jazz (genre) guitarists
Columbia Records artists
Concord Records artists
Deaths from cancer in Maryland
Deaths from lung cancer
Fantasy Records artists
Fingerstyle guitarists
Great Guitars (band) members
Guitarists from Virginia
Jazz musicians from Virginia
Latin jazz guitarists
People from Suffolk, Virginia
Riverside Records artists
Swing guitarists
United States Army personnel of World War II
Virginia Tech alumni